Dharini (aka Whispers of Change) is a 2002 India Oriya film directed by Susant Misra.

Plot 
Four women in a middle-class traditional household fight for dignity in their own ways. Sarala contracts a sexually transmitted disease from her wayward husband and is unable to bear children. She is distraught but helpless. Kamala takes a step towards change in the traditional male dominated family when she is asked to go for a repeated abortion. She defies her husband and leaves the house. Shweta, the widow considered a burden on the family too is encouraged to seek an honourable life. Nandini is already socially active and liberal minded aspiring for a free life away from home.

Cast 
Kirti Kulhari
Rachna Shah
Avni Vasa
Jyoti Dogra
Richa Nayyar
Subrat Dutta

References

External links 

2002 films
2000s Odia-language films